Azuki may refer to:

Adzuki bean
Red bean paste
Azuki Island

People with the surname
Nana Azuki, Japanese musical lyricist 
Yu Azuki, author of Igano Kabamaru

Characters with the name
Miho Azuki, a character in the manga series Bakuman
Azuki Rousai, a character in the novel The Kouga Ninja Scrolls
Azuki-chan (Azusa Noyama), in the anime series Azuki-chan
Azuki Shinatsu, in the manga series Maken-ki!
Azuki Minaduki, in the adult visual novel series Nekopara

Japanese-language surnames